The Tees Valley Wildlife Trust is a wildlife trust covering the Tees Valley area of England.
Its area of operation corresponds to the four unitary authorities of Hartlepool, Stockton-on-Tees, Middlesbrough and Redcar and Cleveland, covering parts of the ceremonial counties of County Durham and North Yorkshire.

Reserves 

Notes 

 Grid references use the British national grid reference system (OSGB36), the system used on Ordnance Survey maps. The grid reference for each reserve relates to the approximate centre of the reserve.

References

External links 

 Tees Valley Wildlife Trust website

Wildlife Trusts of England
Organisations based in North Yorkshire
Organisations based in County Durham